Thrilling Comics is the title of a comic book series published by Standard Comics for 80 issues from 1940 to 1951. The first issue is the first appearance of the comic-book character Doc Strange, who debuted in a 37-page origin story.

The "Thrilling Comics" title was used again in 1999 by DC Comics for one issue of the Justice Society Returns storyline.

Characters
Thrilling Comics #1: Doc Strange
Thrilling Comics #2: Woman in Red (Nedor)
Thrilling Comics #3: The Ghost
Thrilling Comics #19: American Crusader
Thrilling Comics #56: Princess Pantha

References

Comics magazines published in the United States
DC Comics titles
1940 comics debuts
1951 comics endings
Magazines established in 1940
Magazines disestablished in 1951
Golden Age comics titles